James Manson may refer to:

Sports
 James Manson (Australian footballer) (born 1966), Australian rules footballer
 Jim Manson (Australian footballer) (?–2010), Australian rules football player

Others
 James Manson (engineer) (1845–1935), locomotive superintendent of the Glasgow and South Western Railway
 James Bolivar Manson (1879–1945), artist
 James Manson (aviation)
 Jim Manson (politician) (1908–1974), Australian politician, one of the Members of the Victorian Legislative Assembly, 1958–1961
 Little Jimmy Manson, see Murdoc Niccals